KWAK-FM (105.5 FM) is a radio station broadcasting a classic country music format. Licensed to Stuttgart, Arkansas, United States, the station is currently owned by Arkansas County Broadcasters, Inc.

Programming
Along with its usual classic country music programming, KWAK-FM is an affiliate of the Tennessee Titans radio network.

In popular culture
Several characters in the Sam the Dog print and web comic listen to or work for a fictional talk radio station known as "KWAK 92.9, Quack Radio". The station is depicted as a rundown shack on the edge of an unnamed middle-sized American city.

References

External links

WAK-FM
Country radio stations in the United States
Stuttgart, Arkansas